The Yukon/NWT Men's Curling Championship was the men's curling championship that determined Team Yukon/NWT at the Tim Hortons Brier. The tournament featured teams from two of Canada's northern territories, the Northwest Territories (NWT) and the Yukon.  The event was discontinued before 2015 when each territory was granted its own entry into the Brier. It was replaced by the Northwest Territories Men's Curling Championship and the Yukon Men's Curling Championship.

The territories first participated in the 1975 Macdonald Brier.

Qualification
Four teams played in the territories championship. Both the Northwest Territories and the Yukon held separate territorial championships, and the top two teams from each territory then play at the Yukon/NWT championship.

Prior to 1975, teams in the Yukon played in the B.C. provincial playdowns and teams in the Northwest Territories played in the Alberta playdowns.

Winners

Notes

References

The Brier provincial tournaments
Curling in Yukon
Curling in the Northwest Territories